St. Matthew's may refer to:

Cathedrals

Churches

Schools, colleges or universities
 St Matthews University in the Cayman Islands
 St. Matthew High School (Ottawa), Ontario, Canada
 St Matthew's Primary School in Cambridge, England
 St. Matthew's Primary School, Ballyward, County Down
 St. Matthew's Primary School, Fawkner, Victoria
 St. Matthew's Primary School, Bishopbriggs, Glasgow
 St Matthew's Catholic Primary School, Logan City, Queensland, Australia

Places

Belize
 St. Matthews, Belize, a village in Cayo District, Belize

United Kingdom
 St Matthew's, Leicester 
 St Matthew's, Preston

United States
 St. Matthews, Kentucky 
 St. Matthews, South Carolina
 St. Matthew's Episcopal Church (Queens)

Sports
St. Matthew's (soccer team)